Refracting telescopes use a lens to focus light. The largest refracting telescope in the world is the Yerkes Observatory 40 inch (102 cm) refractor, used for astronomical and scientific observation for over a century. The Swedish 1-m Solar Telescope, which has an actual lens diameter of 43 inches, is technically then larger than the lens of the Yerkes, but only 39 inches are clear for the aperture, and is used today for solar observations .The next largest refractor telescopes are the James Lick telescope, and the Meudon Great Refractor.

Most are classical great refractors, which used achromatic doublets on an equatorial mount. However, other large refractors include a 21st-century solar telescope which is not directly comparable because it uses a single element non-achromatic lens, and the short-lived Great Paris Exhibition Telescope of 1900. It used a 78-inch (200 cm) Focault siderostat for aiming light into the Image-forming optical system part of the telescope, which had a 125 cm diameter lens. Using a siderostat incurs a reflective loss.  Larger meniscus lenses have been used in later catadioptric telescopes which mix refractors and reflectors in the image-forming part of the telescope. As with reflecting telescopes, there was an ongoing struggle to balance cost with size, quality, and usefulness.

This list includes some additional examples, such as the Great Paris telescope, which also used a mirror, and some solar telescopes which may have more complicated optical configurations. The SST has an optical aperture of 98 cm (39.37"), although the lens itself is 110 cm (43.31"). It is a single element lens whereas most of this list are doublets, with a crown and flint lens elements.

See also 
 Lists of telescopes
 List of largest optical reflecting telescopes
 List of largest optical telescopes in the 20th century
 List of largest optical telescopes in the 19th century
 List of largest optical telescopes in the 18th century

References

Further reading

List of largest refracting telescopes circa 1914 List

Refracting telescopes
Telescopes